Andriy Hurskyi (born 30 August 1988) is a professional Ukrainian football defender. He is the product of the Karpaty Lviv Youth School System.

External links 
Profile at FFU
Profile on Football Squads

1988 births
Living people
Ukrainian footballers
Association football defenders
Ukrainian Premier League players
Ukrainian expatriate footballers
Expatriate footballers in Belarus
FC Karpaty Lviv players
FC Karpaty-2 Lviv players
FC Prykarpattia Ivano-Frankivsk (2004) players
FC Obolon-Brovar Kyiv players
FC Sevastopol players
FC Gomel players
FC Rukh Lviv players
MFC Mykolaiv players
Sportspeople from Lviv